Veliaj is an Albanian surname. Notable people with the surname include:

 Emiliano Veliaj (born 1985), Albanian football midfielder 
 Erion Veliaj (born 1979), Albanian politician

See also
 Velia (given name)

Albanian-language surnames